The 1896–97 St Helens R.F.C. season was the club's second in the Northern Rugby Football Union. In a divided county championship league, the club finished 9th out of 14. The Challenge Cup was also established that year, and it was St Helens, with Batley who contested the first final; St Helens losing 10-3 with Derek Traynor scoring Saints' only points.

Lancashire Senior Championship

Source: R.L.Yearbook 1995-96 cited in "The Vault".

League points: for win = 2; for draw = 1; for loss = 0.
Pld = Games played; W = Wins; D = Draws; L = Losses; PF = Match points scored; PA = Match points conceded; PD = Points difference; Pts = League points.

References

St Helens R.F.C. seasons
St Helens RLFC season
St Helens RLFC season